G. Nageswara Reddy is an Indian film director, known for his works in Telugu cinema. He worked as an assistant director to S. V. Krishna Reddy, for several films like Rajendrudu Gajendrudu, Mayalodu, Yamaleela, Subhalagnam, Number One, Ghatotkachudu, Vajram and Maavichiguru.

Filmography

References

External links
 

21st-century Indian film directors
Living people
Telugu film directors
Year of birth missing (living people)